The School of Computer Science (SOCS) is an academic department in the Faculty of Science at McGill University in Montreal, Quebec, Canada.  The school is the second most funded computer science department in Canada. It currently has 34 faculty members, 60 Ph.D. students and 100 Master's students.

History
The creation of a Computer Science organization was led by Chair of Electrical Engineering (and later Dean of Engineering) George Lee (John) d'Ombrain. He is credited with bringing the first computer to McGill University in 1958. The first graduate student in computing at McGill University was Gerald Ratzer, who arrived from Cambridge in September 1964. There he pursued an M.Sc. in the Faculty of Graduate Sciences, under the supervision of David Thorpe, Director of the McGill Computing Centre. The School of Computer Science was formally created in 1969.

Computer Science was originally housed in Burnside Hall, which was built in 1970. It is notable for containing the Computing Centre, which contributed funds to Computer Science faculty such as Timothy Howard Merrett. The School moved into the McConnell Building in 1988.

The use of the term "School" was to reinforce the idea of independence from the Faculty of Engineering. Over the years, the School of Computer Science continued to face difficulties over sharing resources such as academic slots, teaching assistants, and space with their Engineering peers. This was partly due to cross-appointments of faculty from Electrical Engineering, leaving Computer Science understaffed. There were also concerns amongst engineers that Computer Science was not a professional discipline, and that students would choose Computer Science over Engineering, lowering the amount of funding available. This led to engineers pressuring the School not to have major and master's degrees for a long time. The minor in Computer Science was created in 1978 with the undergraduate program following in 1979; however, the major program was not created until 1990. Eventually, a heated debate between Dean Dealy of the Faculty of Engineering and Dean Shaver of the Faculty of Science in 1995 led to the School moving to Science in 1997.

Academics

Research
In 1984, McGill University owned the two USENET nodes in Quebec: one for Computer Science, and the other for Computer vision. Around 1992, McGill was also the main network hub for all of Quebec's academic networks In 1985, the McGill Research Centre for Intelligent Machines (McRCIM) was formed by four researchers – Martin Levine, Steve Zucker, Pierre Bélanger, and George Zames. Today, it is known as the Centre for Intelligent Machines, and seeks to advance the state of knowledge in such domains as robotics, automation, artificial intelligence, computer vision, systems and control theory, and speech recognition.

The first Internet Search Engine, Archie search engine, was written in 1989 by three McGill computer science students Alan Emtage, Bill Heelan, and J. Peter Deutsch. In September of the 1993 academic year, a new Major Program for a B.A. in Computer Science was established. This led to a ratio of weighted FTEs per professor (23.18) that was amongst the highest at McGill University. The MUSIC/SP mainframe operating system was developed and marketed by McGill University. With novel features such as file access control and data compression, it was used worldwide until being discontinued in 2007.

Programs offered
The School currently offers the following programs:

Undergraduate
Major, Honours, Liberal, Minor, Major Concentration and Minor concentrations programs in Computer Science
Major, Liberal and Major Concentration programs in Software Engineering
Major in Computer Science: Computer Games Option
Joint Major and Joint Honours in Mathematics and Computer Science
Joint Major and Joint Honours in Statistics and Computer Science
Joint Major in Physics and Computer Science
Joint Major and Joint Honours in Computer Science and Biology

McGill's Computer Science undergraduate society, CSUS, is a team of executive members that work together in representing all undergraduate constituents. They are elected every year and host events, workshops, information sessions and are also available to answer student questions and bring up any concerns that they may have.

Graduate
Master in Computer Science (Thesis): Computational Science and Engineering 
Master in Computer Science (Thesis): Bioinformatics
Master in Computer Science (Non-Thesis)
PhD: advanced research

Enrollment
The following data was taken from the School of Computer Science annual reports (calculated as students in Major and Honours program).

Student Representatives
The Computer Science Undergraduate Society (CSUS)  is an elected student group tasked with improving student academics and life in the computer science department at McGill University. This includes discussing course changes with faculty, organizing events, maintaining the free tutoring services, collating student feedback, and promoting a sense of community.

Buildings

McConnell Engineering Building
The School of Computer Science is located in the McConnell Engineering Building, which was donated to McGill University by John W. McConnell in 1959. McConnell was a major benefactor of the University since 1911 and one of its Governors from 1928 until 1958.

Trottier Building
The Lorne M. Trottier Building houses Computer Science computer labs, classrooms, and study spaces. This building is named after Lorne Trottier, who donated ten million dollars to construct it in 2000/2001. The Trottier Building opened in 2003.

Notable members

Faculty
David Avis - Discrete optimization and computational geometry
Claude Crépeau - Quantum computing and cryptography
Luc Devroye - Probabilistic analysis of algorithms
Gregory Dudek - Robotics
Laurie Hendren - Compiler Techniques and Tools
Prakash Panangaden - Probabilistic Systems, Quantum Information
Joëlle Pineau - Machine Learning
Doina Precup - Reinforcement Learning
Bruce Reed - Graph theory

Former faculty
Patrick Hayden - Quantum information and quantum computing
George Marsaglia - Expert on random number generation
Godfried Toussaint - Computational and discrete geometry
Monty Newborn - Chess AI, automated theorem-proving
Tomasz Imieliński - Databases, Data Mining. Mobile Computing, Search engine technology
Mads Haahr (Visiting Professor) - Physically-derived random number generation, Founder of Random.org

Alumni
Alan Emtage
Changpeng Zhao (the founder of Binance)

References

External links
 http://www.cs.mcgill.ca/

McGill University
Computer science departments in Canada